The History of the administrative divisions of China after 1949 refers to the administrative divisions under the People's Republic of China. In 1949, the communist forces initially held scattered fragments of China at the start of the Chinese Civil War. By late 1949, they controlled the majority of mainland China, forcing the Republic of China government to relocate to Taiwan.

Founding 
The Government of China made the following changes:
 China was divided into 6 greater administrative areas (大行政区 dà xíngzhèngqū) that came above provinces.
 Manchuria was reorganized completely.
 Inner Mongolia was formed out of parts of Manchuria as the first autonomous region.
 The short-lived province Pingyuan was set up.
 Jiangsu was temporarily divided into two administrative regions: Subei and Sunan.
 Anhui was temporarily divided into two administrative regions: Wanbei and Wannan.
 Sichuan was temporarily divided into four administrative regions: Chuandong, Chuannan, Chuanxi and Chuanbei.

1950s 
In 1952, the provinces of Jiangsu, Anhui and Sichuan were restored. Pingyuan and Chahar were split into their surrounding provinces. Nanjing, the old capital of the Republic of China, was deprived of its municipality status and annexed by Jiangsu province. In 1953, Changchun and Harbin were elevated to municipality status.

In 1954, a massive campaign to cut the number of provincial-level divisions was initiated. Of the 14 municipalities existing in 1953, 11 were annexed by nearby provinces, with only Beijing, Shanghai, and Tianjin remaining. The province of Liaoning was formed out of the merger of Liaodong and Liaoxi, while Songjiang, Suiyuan and Ningxia disappeared into Heilongjiang, Inner Mongolia and Gansu, respectively.

The greater administrative area level was abolished in 1954.

The process continued in 1955 with Rehe being split among Hebei, Liaoning and Inner Mongolia, and Xikang disappearing into Sichuan. In that same year Xinjiang became the second autonomous region of China, and plans for a third, Tibet Autonomous Region, were initiated. Qamdo territory was put under the planned Tibet Autonomous Region.

In 1957 two more autonomous regions were added, Ningxia (split back out of Gansu) and Guangxi (which was previously a province). In 1958 Tianjin was annexed by Hebei, leaving only two municipalities, Beijing and Shanghai.

1960s and 1970s 
In 1965 Tibet Autonomous Region was established out of the formerly self-governing Tibet Area, as well as the Qamdo Territory. In 1967 Tianjin was split back out as a municipality.

1980s, 1990s and 2000s 
Starting in the 1980s, prefecture-level cities and county-level cities began to appear in very large numbers, usually by replacing entire prefectures and counties. Hainan and some other islands were split out of Guangdong and set up as a Hainan Province in 1988.

In 1997 Chongqing became the fourth municipality of China. In that same year Hong Kong reverted to Chinese rule and became the first special administrative region. Macau became the second in 1999.

In the 1990s, there was a campaign to abolish district public offices as a level. By 2004 very few remained.

In the meantime, most prefectures have become prefecture-level cities.

List of all provincial-level divisions since 1949

See also
 Administrative divisions of China

External links
Summary of terms
Historical map scans - maps of various sheng, dao, fu, ting, and  xian of the late Qing era.
The province in history by John Fitzgerald

Provinces of China
Administrative divisions of China
Former administrative divisions of China